"Jag reser mig igen" is a song with lyrics by Ted Ström and music by Thomas G:son. It was performed at Melodifestivalen 2012 by Thorsten Flinck & Revolutionsorkestern, and made it further through Andra chansen to the finals inside the Stockholm Globe Arena, where it ended up eight. With 8,4% of the televotes it became the viewers 3rd favourite song. On 6 May 2012, the song entered Svensktoppen.

Charts

References

2012 singles
Melodifestivalen songs of 2012
Songs written by Thomas G:son
Swedish-language songs
2012 songs
Columbia Records singles
Sony Music singles